Wayne Shand (born 17 January 1961) is a former Australian rules footballer who played with Richmond in the Victorian Football League (VFL).

Shand, a half-back from Essex Heights (Wodonga), played senior football for Richmond from 1982 to 1984. He played five games in 1982, six in 1983, then made a single appearance in 1984. After leaving Richmond he was briefly at Footscray, but didn't play a league game, then went to Old Haileyburians in the Victorian Amateur Football Association, as captain-coach.

References

1961 births
Australian rules footballers from Victoria (Australia)
Richmond Football Club players
Old Haileyburians Amateur Football Club players
Living people